Chris Smith (born 29 September 1955) is a former Australian rules footballer who played for the Fitzroy Football Club in the Victorian Football League (VFL) between 1973 and 1982.

Primarily playing as a centre half-back, Smith was notable for playing for most of his career in a helmet, after suffering migraines after being knocked out three times in his first three years.

References

External links

1955 births
Fitzroy Football Club players
Living people
Australian rules footballers from Victoria (Australia)